Xerocrassa simulata is a species of air-breathing land snail, a terrestrial pulmonate gastropod mollusk in the family Geomitridae.

Distribution
This species is common in the deserts and semideserts of the levantine region. Morphology varies greatly with locality.

Life cycle
The size of the egg of this species is 2.6 × 2.1 mm.

References

External links
 Ehrenberg, C. G. (1828-1831). Animalia evertebrata exclusis Insectis. Series prima. In: F. G. Hemprich & C. G. Ehrenberg, Symbolae physicae, seu icones et descriptiones Mammalium, Avium, Insectorum et animalia evertebra, quae ex itinere per Africam borealem et Asiam occidentalem studio nova aut illustrata redierunt. 126 pp. (1831), 10 pls (1828)
 Neubert, E.; Amr, Z. S.; Waitzbauer, W.; Al Talafha, H. (2015). Annotated checklist of the terrestrial gastropods of Jordan (Mollusca: Gastropoda). Archiv für Molluskenkunde. 144(2): 169-238.

simulata
Gastropods described in 1831
Taxa named by Christian Gottfried Ehrenberg